Ghari (also known as Gari, Tangarare, Sughu, and West Guadalcanal) is an Oceanic language spoken on Guadalcanal island of the Solomon Islands.

The Vaturanga dialect has been used extensively in missionary and liturgical translations, leading linguist Arthur Capell to describe it as a mission/ecclesiastical language.

References
Notes

Sources

External links
Na Voihavo Matena na Hahani Tabu online text of Anglican liturgy in Vaturanga, digitized by Richard Mammana
Paradisec open access vocabulary list of the Vaturanga dialect
Paradisec open access Swadesh list of Vaturanga
Paradisec open access full text of A Grammar of the Language of Vaturanga, Guadalcanal, British Solomon Islands
Paradisec open access map of languages of Guadalcanal

Guadalcanal languages
Languages of the Solomon Islands